Congosto is a station on Line 1 of the Madrid Metro. It is located in fare Zone A. The station opened on 3 March 1999.

References 

Line 1 (Madrid Metro) stations
Railway stations in Spain opened in 1999
Buildings and structures in Villa de Vallecas District, Madrid